Bee Mine Secondary School is a co-educational school in Zhombe Communal Land,  Kwekwe District.

Background

Bee Mine Secondary School was established in 1981.

Most Form One students here are Grade Seven graduates from Bee Mine Primary School just a hundred metres east, and small numbers from Somapani Primary School, Sidakeni Primary School and Mopani Primary School.

The school is listed as a geographical place in Midlands Province

Location

It is 101 km northwest of Kwekwe by the shortest route and 73 km southwest of Kadoma and just 5.5 km north of Columbina Rural Service Center in Zhombe-East. It is along the Mabura caves road.

Operations

Bee Mine Secondary School offers educational services from Form 1 to 4.

As a requirement in Zimbabwe GCE O Level pupils must pass a minimum of five subjects which should include, English, Mathematics, Science, History or one of the Technical subjects, and so subjects on offer here are Mathematics, Integrated Sciences, English Literature, English Language, Religious Studies, History, Geography, Commerce, Shona Language and Agriculture.

For GCE A Level the nearest high schools are Nyaradzo High School and Sidakeni High School.

See also

 Bee Mine Primary School
 Somapani Primary School
 Mabura Ward
 List of schools in Zimbabwe

References 

Schools in Zimbabwe